In Inuit mythology, Tekkeitsertok is a god of hunting and the master of caribou, one of the most important hunting gods in the pantheon. Tekkeitsertok is also the protector of any creatures that enter any parts of the northern sky. He has the power to bring aid to the creatures who enter his property, or to ban them from the area.

See also
 Reindeer hunting in Greenland

References

Hunting gods
Inuit gods